Oosthuizen is a South African surname, especially common among Afrikaners. Notable people with the name include:

Andries Oosthuizen (born c. 1954), South African golfer
Caylib Oosthuizen (born 1989), South African rugby union player
 Coenie Oosthuizen (born 1989), South African rugby union player
 D. C. S. Oosthuizen (1926–1969; also known as Daantjie Oosthuizen), South African philosopher
 Devin Oosthuizen (born 1988), South African rugby union player
 Etienne Oosthuizen (born 1992), South African rugby union player
 Etienne Oosthuizen (born 1994), South African rugby union player
 John Robert Oosthuizen (born 1987), South African javelin thrower
 Louis Oosthuizen (born 1982), South African professional golfer
 NJ Oosthuizen (born 1996), South African rugby union player
 Ockie Oosthuizen (1955–2019), South African rugby union player
 Sarel Oosthuizen (1862-1900), Orange Free State Anglo-Boer War general
 Theo Oosthuizen (born 1964), South African rugby union player and coach
 Thomas Oosthuizen (born 1989), South African professional boxer

Also:
 Deon Oosthuysen (born 1963), South African rugby union player and coach

See also
 Oosthuizen, a village in the Dutch province of North Holland
 Oosthuizen's blue (Lepidochrysops oosthuizeni) - a species of butterfly in the family Lycaenidae

Afrikaans-language surnames